Çınar, also spelled Chinar and Çinar, is a Turkic word meaning "plane tree," derived from the Persian word chenar (Persian: چنار), and may refer to:

Places

Albania
Çinar, Albania, a village within the rural town of Fier-Shegan in the county of Fier

Azerbaijan
 Çinar, Azerbaijan, village in Azerbaijan

Turkey
 Çınar, Akyurt, a neighborhood of the district of Akyurt, Ankara Province, Turkey
 Çınar, Diyarbakır, a district of Diyarbakır Province, Turkey

People
 Çınar (surname)

Other uses
 Çınar Incident, the name of a 17th-century rebellion in the Ottoman Empire
 Çınar Ağacı, a 2011 Turkish comedy-drama film
 Chinar, Russia, a rural locality in the Republic of Dagestan, Russia
 Chinar, alternative spelling of Chinor, a town in Tajikistan
 Chinar, a common name for Platanus orientalis, the oriental plane tree

See also
 Chenar (disambiguation), places in Iran
 Çınarlı (disambiguation)